Petit-de-Grat Island is a Canadian island off the coast of Cape Breton Island, in Richmond County, Nova Scotia. The island's main community is Petit-de-Grat. The first settlers came from the Basque region of Spain in 1714.
Petit-de-Grat Island is connected by causeway to neighbouring Isle Madame.

References
Petit-de-Grat Acadian Festival

Islands of Nova Scotia
Landforms of Richmond County, Nova Scotia